Adam Gibbs is an American voice actor who provides voices for English versions of Japanese anime series. He is known for his lead roles of Hotaro Oreki from Hyouka, Masaya Hinata from Aokana: Four Rhythm Across the Blue, Shinichi Izumi from Parasyte, Hachiman Hikigaya from the My Youth Romantic Comedy Is Wrong, As I Expected series, Seiya Kanie from Amagi Brilliant Park, Taichi Mashima from Chihayafuru, Kei Kuramoto from Flying Witch, Hiromi Nase from Beyond the Boundary series, Fumiya Tomozaki in Bottom-tier Character Tomozaki, and Nice from Hamatora.

Biography 
Gibbs is associated with Sentai Filmworks and Funimation. He also acts at Theatre Under the Stars, Classical Theatre Company, Alley Theatre, and Stages Repertory.

Filmography

Anime

Film

Web

References 

Living people
American male voice actors
Male actors from Texas
Year of birth missing (living people)